Hava Aney Dey is a 2004 Indian Hindi-language drama film written and directed by Partho Sen-Gupta. It stars Aniket Vishwasrao, Nishikant Kamat, Tannishtha Chatterjee and Rajshree Thakur in the lead roles. The film was shot on location in the northern suburbs (Vikhroli and Andheri East) of Mumbai, India, in October–November 2003 with a mixed crew composed of French and Indian technicians. It is an Indo-French co-production between Santocha Productions, Paris and Mystique Media Ltd, Mumbai and Independent Movies LTD, Mumbai. It was also funded partly by the Fonds Sud, of the French Foreign Ministry and the French Cultural Ministry. It was post-produced partly in Mumbai and Paris.

Plot
"India is in the throes of the new global economy. The new capitalist order is changing people’s lives. But a new war of ideals is separating the old values from the new… There is also the war with Pakistan… the two brothers who are fighting for Kashmir. The two countries have equipped themselves with Oppenheimer’s deadly toy."

Arjun (Aniket Vishwasrao), 18 years old, lives in the northern suburbs of Bombay with his widowed mother Sheela, who works hard to make ends meet. She has one goal in life: that Arjun gets a diploma and a good job. Arjun is attracted to Salma (Rajshree Thakur), a girl from a Muslim upper-class family. Arjun knows that she is beyond his reach.

Chabia (Nishikant Kamat), 21 years old, is Arjun's best friend and a mechanic in a garage. Chabia loves Mona (Tannishtha Chatterjee), a dancer in a cabaret bar. Chabia hates seeing the rich men showering her with money as she dances for them. She wants to go and work in Dubai.

Rohit, a rich young man, brings his BMW car to service it in Chabia's garage. Chabia fixes his car with cheap spares that he has procured from dubious sources.

Rohit is happy and invites Chabia for a drink in a posh club in downtown Bombay. Chabia thinks that this is an opportunity to meet upper-class people. But things turn out badly for him and the bouncers beat him up. Rohit does not help.

Tensions on the Pakistan border increase, and the military build-up intensifies. Both countries test their intercontinental ballistic missiles.

Chabia steals money from his brother and plans to run away with Mona and start a new life. But she hesitates at the last minute and goes to work in the cabarets of Dubai. Arjun fails his diploma examination as he tries to cheat using fake papers that Chabia procured for him. The two friends want to do something to leave this climate of despair.

An old friend returns from abroad with stories of his fortunes. He was going to retire in a few years. He had made his money. Chabia tries to convince Arjun to go abroad with him, but Arjun does not want to leave his mother alone. Chabia and Arjun decide to meet an employment agent who promises them jobs for a huge fee. Chabia arranges his fee, but Arjun cannot manage his. Chabia tells him to ask his mother Sheela to lend him the money. At first, Sheela is very angry but succumbs to her son's demand.

The day before their departure, they celebrate their farewell. The mood is upbeat. However, India and Pakistan destroy each other's major cities with nuclear bombs.

Cast
 Aniket Vishwasrao as Arjun
 Nishikant Kamat as Chabia
 Tannishtha Chatterjee as Mona
 Rajshree Thakur as Salma
 Hridaynath Jadhav as Anil
 Yogesh Vinayak Joshi as Yogi
 Chinmay Kelkar as Sanju
 Tejas D. Parvatkar as Sudhir
 Deepak Qazir as Employment Agent
 Niaal Saad as Rohit
 Pubali Sanyal as Illa
 Ganesh Yadav as Sudhakar

Production credits
 Story and direction: Partho Sen-Gupta
 Screenplay and dialogues: Yogesh Vinayak Joshi & Partho Sen-Gupta
 Producer: Marie-Cécile Destandau
 Executive producer: Rakesh Mehra
 Co-producer: Brij Rathi 
 Original music by Eryck Abecassis
 Cinematography by Jean-Marc Ferriére
 Film editing by Annick Raoul
 Casting by Yogesh Vinayak Joshi
 Production design by Agnes Vergne
 Sound designer: Nikolas Javelle
 Location sound: Jacques Sans
 Re-recordist: Nathalie Vidal

Distribution and reception
It premièred at the Berlinale (Berlin International Film Festival) in 2004 and won awards at other important international film festivals.

Hava Aney Dey is part of the Global Film Initiative's Global Lens 2008 Film Lineup of ten award-winning narrative, feature films from Argentina, China, Croatia, India, Indonesia, Iran, Lebanon, Philippines and South Africa. Global Lens 2008, its fifth year, premièred at the Museum of Modern Art, (MOMA) New York City in January, before embarking on a year-long tour of over 30 cities across the United States.

The Indian Film Censor Board refused to give it a release certificate without a long list of sound and picture cuts reducing about 20 minutes of the film. The director refused to accept the censor decision, as it would destroy the film with the abrupt cuts and sound mutes. It was never released in India.

The film was never officially screened in India as it was pulled out at the last minute (despite the selection by the festival) from the Cinefan film festival in New Delhi in 2005 by the censors. Indian filmmakers, artists, writers opposed to censorship continue to fight for the freedom to express themselves.

Film festival selections and awards

Awards
 Best Film Award (Durban International Film Festival)
 BBC Audience Award (Commonwealth Film Festival)
 Special Jury Mention (Hong Kong International Film Festival)

Selections
 2004 Berlin International Film Festival
 2004 Hong Kong International Film Festival 
 2004 Commonwealth Film FestivalManchester, United Kingdom
 2004 Durban International Film Festival Durban, South Africa
 2004 3rd Eye Asian Film Festival Mumbai, India
 2004 Tokyo Filmex 
 2004 3 continents Film Festival, (Nantes, France)
 2004 River to River Indian Film Festival, Florence, Italy
 2008 International Film Festival Rotterdam, Rotterdam, Netherlands

See also
 Censorship in India

References

External links

Director's Official Website
Interview at the Festival des 3 continents, Nantes, 2004
Film page on Bluescreen films Website

2000s Hindi-language films
2004 drama films
2004 films
Indian drama films
French drama films
Censorship in India
Films set in Mumbai
Hindi-language drama films
Films about nuclear war and weapons
India–Pakistan relations in popular culture
Nuclear weapons programme of India
Anti-nuclear movement in India
2000s French films